Pecluma pastazensis is a species of fern in the family Polypodiaceae. It is endemic to Ecuador.  Its natural habitats are subtropical or tropical moist lowland forests and subtropical or tropical moist montane forests. It is threatened by habitat loss.

References

Polypodiaceae
Ferns of Ecuador
Endemic flora of Ecuador
Ferns of the Americas
Near threatened flora of South America
Taxonomy articles created by Polbot